Muhlenbergia microsperma is a species of grass known by the common name littleseed muhly. It is native to the Americas from the Southwestern United States and California through Central America into Peru and Venezuela.

It can be found in many habitat types, including disturbed areas.

It is an annual or perennial grass growing up to 60 to 80 centimeters tall. The inflorescence is an open, spreading array of thin branches bearing small spikelets which have awns up to 3 centimeters long. Spikelets lower in the inflorescence stay within sheaths and do not bloom.

External links
Jepson Manual Treatment
USDA Plants Profile
Grass Manual Treatment
Photo gallery

microsperma
Grasses of Mexico
Grasses of the United States
Native grasses of California
Flora of South America
Flora of the Southwestern United States
Flora of Baja California
Flora of Peru
Flora of Sonora
Flora of Venezuela
Flora of the California desert regions
Flora of the Sonoran Deserts
Natural history of the California chaparral and woodlands
Natural history of the Mojave Desert
Natural history of the Peninsular Ranges
Natural history of the Santa Monica Mountains
Natural history of the Transverse Ranges
Plants described in 1813
Flora without expected TNC conservation status